The Last Traitor (also known as Thirteenth Is a Judas) is a 1971 Italian Spaghetti Western film directed by Giuseppe Vari.

Plot 

A wedding is set to take place in Sonora, Mexico sometime after the American Civil War. Former Confederate Captain Ned Carter is to marry Mary Belle. Ned's former comrades make up his wedding guests and they feast awaiting the arrival of Marry Belle on a mail stagecoach from El Paso.

The stagecoach arrives, but everyone aboard has been murdered. For what, and by whom? Something doesn't add up, and the mystery only deepens as wedding guests begin to die under suspicious circumstances.

Cast 

 Donald O'Brien: Captain Ned Carter
 Maurice Poli: Tim
 Dino Strano: Joe  (credited as Dean Stratford)
 Maily Doria: Mary Belle Owens
 Fortunato Arena: Richter Stump
 Giuseppe Castellano: Slim
 Adriana Giuffré: Emilia
 Attilio Dottesio: General
 Franco Pesce: Fotograf

References

External links

1971 films
Films directed by Giuseppe Vari
Films scored by Carlo Savina
Spaghetti Western films
1971 Western (genre) films
1970s Italian films